Roopatara is a Kannada monthly film magazine, published in Karnataka, India, which has its headquarters in Manipal, Karnataka.

Sandhya Pai is the managing editor of the magazine.

History
Roopatara was launched in April 1977 in Manipal, by Manipal Media Network Ltd. The first edition's cover page featured Rajkumar.

Sister publications
 Taranga, a Kannada weekly family interest magazine
 Tunturu, a Kannada bi-monthly children magazine
 Tushara, a Kannada monthly literary magazine
 Udayavani, a Kannada daily newspaper

See also
 Mangala, a Kannada monthly film magazine
 List of Kannada-language magazines
 Media in Karnataka

References

Film magazines published in India
1977 establishments in Karnataka
Kannada-language magazines
Mass media in Karnataka
Monthly magazines published in India
Magazines established in 1977